Said Mohammed Djohar ( 22 August 1918 – 22 February 2006) was a Comorian politician who served as the 4th President of the Comoros from 1989 to 1995.

Climb to power
Born in Majunga, Madagascar, Djohar was the half brother of socialist Comorian president Ali Soilih, who had been brought to power in a coup d'état organised by Bob Denard. After Denard reinstated the previous president, Ahmed Abdallah, Djohar's political aspirations suffered a serious setback. He became a supreme court judge during this time. The conflict between Denard and Abdallah created an opportunity for Djohar, and on November 27, 1989, the day after Abdallah was killed, Djohar became leader of the provisional government as well as head of the board of directors of the African International Bank.

Fall
In late September 1995, during Operation Azalee the government of the Comoros was again overthrown by Bob Denard and his band of mercenaries, with Djohar being held prisoner in military barracks for several days. The French government flew him to Réunion for 'medical treatment', and denied him a return to the Comoros until January 1996. When he was able to return, he was restored to the presidency. He left office in March 1996, after Mohamed Taki Abdoulkarim won the presidential election.

Djohar died at his home outside the capital Moroni on 22 February 2006. He was 87 years of age.

References 

Djohar, Said Mohamed 
2006 deaths
Presidents of the Comoros
Leaders who took power by coup
Leaders ousted by a coup
Comorian judges
Comorian Union for Progress politicians
Malagasy emigrants to the Comoros